Fool's Parade is the fifth solo album by Peter Wolf, released in 1998 (see 1998 in music). The album was named one of the Essential Recordings of the '90s by Rolling Stone's Jann Wenner.

Track listing
"Long Way Back Again" (Will Jennings, Wolf) – 3:43
"Turnin' Pages" (Taylor Rhodes, Wolf) – 3:38
"Anything at All" (Jennings, John L. Keller, Wolf) – 4:30
"Pleasing to Me" (Jennings, Wolf) – 3:36
"The Cold Heart of the Stone" (Jennings, Wolf) – 3:02
"All Torn Up" (Rhodes, Wolf) – 4:13
"Roomful of Angels" (Rhodes, Wolf) – 4:29
"If You Wanna Be with Somebody" (Steve Jordan, Wolf) – 4:01
"I'd Rather Be Blind, Crippled and Crazy" (Darryl Carter, Charles Hodges, O. V. Wright) – 3:31
"Ride Lonesome, Ride Hard" (Jennings, Wolf) – 4:05
"Waiting on the Moon" (Jennings, Wolf) – 3:40

Personnel
Peter Wolf – vocals, background vocals
Johnny A. – guitar, electric guitar
Tony Beard – drums
Crispin Cioe – horn
John Conte – bass, upright bass
Steve Conte – guitar
Cornell Dupree – guitar
Ada Dyer – vocals, background vocals
Laurence Etkin – horn
Bob Funk – horn
Jeff Golub – guitar
Arno Hecht – horn
Bashiri Johnson – percussion
Robert White Johnson – background vocals
Stanley Jordan – guitar, keyboard
Curtis King – background vocals
Will Lee – bass
Duke Levine – guitar
Shawn Pelton – drums
Leon Pendarvis – keyboard
Taylor Rhodes – background vocals
Vaneese Thomas – background vocals
Marco Vitali – violin
Jimmy Vivino – guitar
Kenny White – bass, keyboard, background vocals
Teresa Williams – background vocals

Production
Producers: Peter Wolf, Stanley Jordan, Taylor Rhodes, Kenny White
Engineers: Rob Eaton, Stanley Jordan, Taylor Rhodes
Assistant engineers: Dave Fisher, Karen Rome
Mixing: Rob Eaton
Mastering: Ted Jensen, Bob Ludwig
Art direction: Margery Greenspan
Photography: Nancy Hodgins, Ken Schles

Notes 

Peter Wolf albums
1998 albums
Mercury Records albums